beatmaniaIIDX 20 tricoro is a music video game and the 20th installment of the Beatmania IIDX series of video games. It was first announced on April 14, 2012. Location tests began in Akihabara and Osaka on April 18 and 20, 2012 respectively. Both ended on April 24, 2012. It was released on September 19, 2012 for new cabinets and September 25, 2012 for upgrade kits of old machines. This is the 1st game that requires an internet connection for startup.

Gameplay 

Beatmania IIDX tasks the player with performing songs through a controller consisting of seven key buttons and a scratchable turntable. Hitting the notes with strong timing increases the score and groove gauge bar, allowing the player to finish the stage. Failing to do so depletes the gauge until it is empty, abruptly ending the song.

References

External links 
 Official location test site 
 Official site 

Arcade video games
Arcade-only video games
Beatmania games
Japan-exclusive video games
Multiplayer and single-player video games
2012 video games
Video games developed in Japan